"It's All Over" is a song written and originally recorded by Johnny Cash.

Released in September 1976 as a single (Columbia 3-10424, with "Ridin' on the Cotton Belt" on the B-side), the song reached number 41 on U.S. Billboard country chart for the week of November 27.

Later the song was included on the Cash album Greatest Hits, Vol. 3 (1978).

Track listing

Charts

References

External links 
 "It's All Over" (single version) on the Johnny Cash official website

Johnny Cash songs
1976 songs
1976 singles
Songs written by Johnny Cash
Columbia Records singles